The EIAJ connector type, more formally known as EIAJ RC-5320A, is a type of coaxial power connector or jack for small appliances.

Features

The entire series of connectors has a built-in retention feature. On types 1, 2, and 3 this involves a bevel on the barrel near the tip, while on types 4 and 5 the tip of the insulator ring has a larger diameter than the metal barrel.

Types

The design philosophy is that higher voltages should be supplied via larger plugs to prevent equipment damage.  A larger plug will not go into a smaller jack.

History

This standard was originally created in 1992 as EIAJ RC-6705, updated in 1997, and updated again in 2005.

The Electronic Industries Association of Japan (EIAJ) and the Japan Electronic Industries Development Association have merged to form the Japan Electronics and Information Technology Industries Association (JEITA), an electronics and IT industry trade organization.

ET-2502A
The use of these connectors on equipment is defined in JEITA ET-2502A. For instance, this document describes the interface between a car cigarette plug or RC-5321 plug and the powered device, the polarity symbol used (JEITA CP-1104A),

EIAJ RC-5321
This is a unique-looking barrel connector, apparently intended for providing a DC output jack (most DC jacks are used for power input).

Possibly available in multiple voltage ranges, the one for voltage classification 2 (3.15 to 6.3 V) has an outside diameter of 4.75 mm and a protruding pin of 2.5 mm diameter.

Previously known as EIAJ RCX-5321.

EIAJ RC-5322
According to Hosiden, this is a 12V/24V barrel connector designed for electronic equipment used in cars. The outside diameter is 6.5mm. 

Previously known as EIAJ RCX-5322.

Companies that use this standard
 Sony - Japan
 Pioneer - Japan
 Panasonic Formerly Matsushita Electric Industrial Co., Ltd. - Japan

See also
 Coaxial power connector
 DC connector
 Phone connector (audio)
 JEITA

References

External links
 JEITA Connector Standards (inherited from EIAJ)

DC power connectors